Absalom (Avshalom) is a son of King David in the Old Testament. 

Absalom, Absalon, Absolem, Absolon or Avshalom may also refer to:


Places
 Avshalom, Israel, a communal settlement in southern Israel
 Avshalom, Sinai, a former Israeli settlement in the Sinai Peninsula
 Mount Absalom, Antarctica
 Yad Avshalom, an ancient tomb in the Kidron Valley near Jerusalem

Arts and entertainment
 Absalom (2000 AD), a 2000 AD character and eponymous series spun off from Caballistics Inc. (2011)
 Absalom (comics), a Marvel Comics character (1992)
 Absalom (One Piece), a fictional character in Eiichirō Oda's manga One Piece (1997)
 Absolon (film), a 2003 science fiction film
 Absolem the Caterpillar, a character in Tim Burton's 2010 film Alice in Wonderland
 Absalom, a fictional character in Cry, The Beloved Country by Alan Paton (1948)
 "Absalom", a science fiction story by Henry Kuttner anthologized in the collection Tomorrow, the Stars (1952)
 Absalom, a 2009 play by Zoe Kazan

Other uses
 Absalom (1853), a wooden ketch
 Absalom (name), including a list of people with either the given name or the surname
Royal Danish Navy ships named HDMS Absalon

See also
 Absalom, Absalom! (1936), a novel by William Faulkner